The 1983 French Open boys' singles tournament was an event during the 1983 French Open tennis tournament. Tarik Benhabiles was the defending champion but lost in the quarterfinals.

Stefan Edberg won in the final 2–6, 6–2, 6–1, against Franck Fevrier.

Draw

Finals

Top half

Section 1

Section 2

Bottom half

Section 3

Section 4

References

Boys' Singles
1983